Hakea costata, commonly known as the ribbed hakea, is a shrub in the family Proteaceae native to Western Australia. A multi-stemmed small shrub producing attractive pink or white brush-like blooms rich in nectar from July to October.

Description
The smaller branches are densely covered in long soft straight hairs when flowering. Leaves vary depending on where they appear on the shrub. The leaves upper surface have no obvious veins whereas the underside has a prominent mid-vein. The fruit surface is smooth to slightly warty. The black-brown seeds are more or less elliptic shaped with a wide wing down one side and a narrower wing down the other.

Taxonomy and naming
Hakea costata was first formally described by the botanist Carl Meissner in 1845 and published in Johann Georg Christian Lehmann's book Plantae Preissianae.
The specific epithet is derived from the Latin (costatus) meaning "ribbed", referring to the longitudinal ribbing of the leaves.

Distribution
Ribbed hakea is endemic to an area along the west coast in the Wheatbelt and Mid West regions of Western Australia from about Kalbarri in the north to Yanchep in the south growing in sandy soils over limestone or laterite.

References

costata
Eudicots of Western Australia
Plants described in 1845
Taxa named by Carl Meissner